Las Agüeras is one of thirteen parishes (administrative divisions) in Quirós, a municipality within the province and autonomous community of the Principality of Asturias, in northern Spain.

The population is 162 (INE 2010).

Villages
 Aciera
 Las Agüeras
 El Carrilón
 Cortina
 Ḷḷano
 Pirueño
 Tene
 Viḷḷuriche

References

Parishes in Quirós